The Fiji Fed Cup team represents Fiji in Fed Cup tennis competition and are governed by the Fiji Tennis Association.  They have not competed since 2001.

History
Fiji competed in its first Fed Cup in 1999. Fiji started competing as part of the Pacific Oceania team.  Their best result was finishing sixth in Group II in 1999. However they have not competed since 2001.

See also

Fed Cup
Fiji Davis Cup team

External links

Fiji
Billie Jean King Cup
Billie Jean King Cup